The 1969 Stanley Cup Finals was the championship series of the National Hockey League's (NHL) 1968–69 season, and the culmination of the 1969 Stanley Cup playoffs. It was contested between the defending champion Montreal Canadiens and the St. Louis Blues, a rematch of the previous year's finals. As they did in the previous matchup, the Canadiens won the series in four games.

Paths to the Finals
Montreal defeated the New York Rangers 4–0 and the Boston Bruins 4–2 to advance to the finals.

St. Louis defeated the Philadelphia Flyers and Los Angeles Kings in four games each.

Game summaries
This was the second playoff series between these two teams. Their only previous meeting came in the previous year's Stanley Cup final. In this year's six-game regular season series, there were five wins for Montreal and one tie.

Claude Ruel became the eleventh rookie coach to win the Stanley Cup. Montreal goaltender Rogie Vachon limited St. Louis to three goals in four games. In the process, he earned his first career playoff shutout.

Stanley Cup engraving
The 1969 Stanley Cup was presented to Canadiens captain Jean Beliveau by NHL President Clarence Campbell following the Canadiens 2–1 win over the Blues in game four.

The following Canadiens players and staff had their names engraved on the Stanley Cup

1968–69 Montreal Canadiens

Won 4 Stanley Cups in 5 Years with Montreal 1965, 1966, 1968, 1969
Ralph Backstrom, Jean Beliveau, Yvan Cournoyer, Dick Duff, John Ferguson, Terry Harper, Ted Harris, Jacques Laperriere, Claude Provost, Henri Richard, Bobby Rousseau, Gilles Tremblay, Jean-Claude Tremblay, Gump Worsley (14 players), David Molson, Sam Pollock, Larry Aubut (3 non-players).

See also
 1968–69 NHL season

Notes

References
 
 

Stanley Cup
Stanley Cup Finals
Montreal Canadiens games
St. Louis Blues games
Ice hockey competitions in St. Louis
Ice hockey competitions in Montreal
1960s in St. Louis
Stanley Cup Finals
Stanley Cup Finals
Stanley Cup Finals
1960s in Montreal
Stanley Cup Finals